The St Andrews Prize for the Environment is a prestigious international environmental award funded and administered by the University of St Andrews in Scotland, United Kingdom. Prior to 2020, the American exploration and production company ConocoPhillips sponsored the prize.  

The award recognises significant contributions to environmental issues and concerns aligned to the Sustainable Development Goals. Applications are invited from individuals, multi-disciplinary teams or community groups. The winning environmental project receives funding of US$100,000 and each of the two runners-up receive US$25,000.

The current Chair of the eight-person judging panel is CEO of the Royal Academy of Engineering, Hayaatun Sillem.

List of Winners
List of winners has been taken from the St Andrews Prize website:

2019—Present

2009—2018

1999—2008

See also

 List of environmental awards

References

Environmental awards
Prize for the Environment, St Andrews
Scottish awards
1998 establishments in Scotland
Awards established in 1998
Nature conservation in Scotland